Frederick Rudolph Hay (born 1784) was an engraver known for his landscape and architectural work.  

He was born in Edinburgh and studied under Robert Scott before moving in 1805 to London where he spent the rest of his career. 

His work was included in Britannia depicta.

Books with his works 
Engravings Of The Most Noble The Marquis Of Stafford's Collection Of Pictures, In London, Arranged According To Schools, And In Chronological Order, With Remarks On Each Picture. By William Young Ottley, Esq. F.S.A. The Executive Part Under The Management Of Peltro William Tomkins, Esq. Historical Engraver To Her Majesty. - Vol. I. (- IV.) 

Modern Athens! Displayed In A Series Of Views: Or Edinburgh In The Nineteenth Century: Exhibiting The Whole Of The New Buildings, Modern Improvements, Antiquities, And Picturesque Scenery, Of The Scottish Metropolis And Its Environs, From Original Drawings, By Mr. Thomas H. Shepherd. With Historical, Topographical, And Critical Illustrations.

The Arabian Antiquities Of Spain. By James Cavanah Murphy.

References

British engravers
1784 births
Year of death missing